Phrudoneura is a genus of fly in the family Dolichopodidae from the Australasian realm. It was originally created as a subgenus of Sympycnus. It is currently regarded as incertae sedis within the family by Daniel J. Bickel (2013), though is possibly close to Sympycninae.

Species
 Phrudoneura abbreviata (Meuffels & Grootaert, 1987) – Papua New Guinea, Australia (NT, Qld), Solomon Islands
 Phrudoneura adusta Bickel, 2013 – New Caledonia
 Phrudoneura collessi Bickel, 2013 – Australia (WA, NSW, Qld)
 Phrudoneura hibernalis Bickel, 2013 – New Caledonia
 Phrudoneura maculata Meuffels & Grootaert, 2002 – New Caledonia
 Phrudoneura matilei Meuffels & Grootaert, 2002 – New Caledonia
 Phrudoneura obscura Meuffels & Grootaert, 2002 – New Caledonia
 Phrudoneura parva Meuffels & Grootaert, 2002 – New Caledonia
 Phrudoneura picta Meuffels & Grootaert, 2002 – New Caledonia
 Phrudoneura popondetta Bickel, 2013 – Papua New Guinea

References

Dolichopodidae genera
Diptera of Australasia